Alangium chinense is a species of flowering plant in the Cornaceae family. It has the Chinese name.

Traditional uses
It is one of the 50 fundamental herbs used in traditional Chinese medicine. In Hunan herbal medicine it is used for snake bites, circulation, contraception, hemostasis, numbness, poison, rheumatism, and wounds.

Other uses 
Oil extracted from the seed of the plant can be used to light lamps.

See also
Chinese herbology

References

External links
Alangium chinense (Google Images)
Alangium chinense Ethnomedical Uses (Dr. Duke's Databases)
Alangium chinense (Plants for a Future Database)
Alangium chinense (Lour.) Harms Medicinal Plant Images Database (School of Chinese Medicine, Hong Kong Baptist University)  

chinense
Plants used in traditional Chinese medicine